Rune Christiansen (born 10 April 1963 in Bergen) is a Norwegian poet and novelist. He is a professor of creative writing at Telemark University College. He won the Brage Prize in 2014 and the Gyldendal lifetime award in 2015.

Rune Christiansen debuted as a poet in 1986. Since then, he has written twelve collections of poems, and nine novels. He has also translated Alain Bosquet, Eugenio Montale, Frank Kuppner and Edmond Jabès.

He grew up at Østerås and resides in Vestfossen.

Bibliography
1986: Hvor toget forlater havet, poem
1987: Sanger fra måneraketten, poem
1989: I dødvanne, poem
1990: Hvalene i Glasgow, novel
1991: Skilpaddedøgn, poem
1992: Dypt mørke, novel
1993: En følsom tid, poem
1994: Motormelkeveien, poem
1996: Anticamera, poem (ed. it. AntiCamera, Lavìs 2015)
1997: Steve McQueen er død, novel
1999: Etter alltid, poem
2000: På ditt aller vakreste, novel
2002: Om trær som vokser seg skakke i trange skyggefulle hager, men som likevel (eller nettopp derfor) gjør inntrykk og som man husker livet ut, poem
2002:  25 February , essay
2003: Intimiteten, novel.
2007: Fraværet av musikk, novel
2009: Krysantemum, novel
2014: Ensomheten i Lydia Ernemans liv, novel

Collections

1998: Lett ferd: Dikt i utvalg, poem
2004: Samlede dikt'', poem

References

External links
Poems of Rune Christiansen at nytallerken
 Rune Christiansen at NRK Forfatter
 Rune Christiansen at Dagbladet Forfatter
 Rune Christiansen at Aftenposten Alex

20th-century Norwegian poets
1963 births
Living people
Writers from Bærum
20th-century Norwegian novelists
21st-century Norwegian novelists
Dobloug Prize winners
21st-century Norwegian poets
Norwegian male poets
Norwegian male novelists
20th-century Norwegian male writers
21st-century Norwegian male writers